Ranunculus reptans is a species of flowering plant belonging to the family Ranunculaceae.

Its native range is Subarctic and Temperate Northern Hemisphere.

References

reptans